Allaire is a surname of French origin, mainly found in Northern France (Brittany), Jersey, and Quebec.

Etymology
The Breton toponymic origin of the surname Allaire is described by Francis Gourvil in his publication Noms de famille bretons d'origine toponymique.  This would point to  Allaire, a commune located in the Morbihan department.

Other Breton toponymic connections include lieux-dits "Ville-Allaire" in the communes of Langouet (Ille-et-Vilaine) and Illifaut (Côtes-d'Armor).

Two other possible etymologies can be traced:

 Variant form of Hilaire, French form of Latin Hilarius, derived from Latin hilaris meaning "joyful".
 In Brittany can be given after saint Aloire, bishop of Quimper, Brittany.

Some variations
 Alair, Aler, Alere, Allair, Allayre, Allere, Alarius
 Dallaire (e.g. Roméo Dallaire), Delair, Deller
 Halair, Haler

People

Anthony Allaire (1829–1903), American firefighter and police officer
François Allaire (born 1959), ice hockey coach
Gaston Allaire (1916–2011), Canadian musicologist, organist, pianist and composer
James P. Allaire (1785–1858), American mechanic and steam engine builder
Jean Allaire (born 1930), Quebecer politician and lawyer
Jeremy Allaire (born 1971), American technologist and Internet entrepreneur
Joseph J. Allaire (born 1969), American software engineer and Internet entrepreneur
Paul Allaire (1938-2019), businessman, CEO of Xerox Corporation

References

External links
 "Les Familles Allaire et Dallaire" by Violette Allaire (1962) (English & French)

French-language surnames

de:Allaire (Begriffsklärung)
fr:Allaire